wefox Arena Schaffhausen is a combined multi-purpose stadium and shopping complex in Schaffhausen, Switzerland. It is the home ground of the football team FC Schaffhausen.

Overview
The stadium was originally named LIPO Park after its anchor tenant, Swiss furniture retailer LIPO. It replaced at the beginning of 2017 FC Schaffhausen's previous home ground Stadion Breite. The stadium has a seated capacity of 8,200 spectators for football matches capable of accommodating 20,000 people for large events like concerts. The main stand of the stadium is a three-storey building of which two lower storeys consist of sales, office and catering areas. The top floor houses lounges and VIP boxes.

The stadium is equipped with a heatable artificial turf and meets FIFA requirements. The construction of the football stadium was cross-financed by integrated commercial uses (retail and service areas). The stadium is multi-purpose with an area of 8,100 m2. It features the largest in-roof photovoltaic system in Switzerland, and can be used for non-football events. The city of Schaffhausen has approved twelve major events with over 20,000 visitors per year. 

FC Schaffhausen played their first Challenge League match at the new stadium on 25 February 2017 against FC Winterthur.

References

External links
Official website

Multi-purpose stadiums in Switzerland
Football venues in Switzerland
Schaffhausen